Matías Exequiel Orihuela Bonino (born 17 February 1992) is an Argentine professional footballer who plays as a left-back for Atlético Tucumán.

Career
Orihuela played for Instituto at youth level. He got his career underway with Deportivo Morón in 2012. He made his professional debut in Primera B Metropolitana against Central Córdoba on 30 October, which was the first of thirty-five total appearances across the 2012–13 and 2013–14 seasons in all competitions. Estudiantes completed the signing of Orihuela on 7 July 2014. However, he departed the club less than two years later after featuring in just two first-team fixtures. January 2016 saw Orihuela join fellow Primera División side Quilmes. He scored his first senior goal in his second match, netting versus San Lorenzo on 20 March at home.

He remained with Quilmes until mid-2017, when he departed following their relegation to Primera B Nacional; subsequently signing for Tigre. He played in two games in the first part of 2017–18 with Tigre, facing Chacarita Juniors and Temperley; a team who then signed Orihuela in January 2018. A Temperley debut at La Bombonera against Boca Juniors on 11 February was followed by seven further appearances in a season that ended with the club being relegated. On 18 August 2018, Orihuela joined Superleague Greece club Apollon Smyrnis. He appeared twenty times as they were relegated with just ten points; his last game was against Lamia.

On 22 July 2019, Newell's Old Boys announced terms had been agreed with Orihuela. After going unused on the substitute's bench for four matches across the next seven months, his debut belatedly arrived on 28 February 2020 as he played the full duration of an away draw with Racing Club. His next appearance would come almost twelve months later, as he came off the bench in a home loss to Boca Juniors on 21 February 2021.

In July 2021, Orihuela moved to fellow league club Atlético Tucumán on a deal until the end of 2022. Ahead of the 2022 season, Orihuela was - however - relegated to the reserve squad, as he wasn't a part of the club's plans.

Career statistics
.

Notes

References

External links

1992 births
Living people
Footballers from Córdoba, Argentina
Argentine footballers
Association football defenders
Argentine expatriate footballers
Expatriate footballers in Greece
Argentine expatriate sportspeople in Greece
Primera B Metropolitana players
Argentine Primera División players
Super League Greece players
Deportivo Morón footballers
Estudiantes de La Plata footballers
Quilmes Atlético Club footballers
Club Atlético Tigre footballers
Club Atlético Temperley footballers
Apollon Smyrnis F.C. players
Newell's Old Boys footballers
Atlético Tucumán footballers